Luís Marques Guedes (born 25 August 1957) is a Portuguese lawyer and politician. He was Secretary of State for the Presidency of the Council of Ministers of the government of Pedro Passos Coelho, Secretary of State to the Prime Minister of Portugal, and the Government XII Undersecretary of State Assistant to the Prime Minister. He held the position of Chairman of the Parliamentary Group of the Social Democratic Party, of which he has been a member since 1995. When he ceased his activities as Minister of the Presidency, in late 2015, he became President of the Parliamentary Commission on Ethics, a section of the First Commission on Fundamental Rights.

He was deputy mayor of Cascais, and was responsible for the legal departments, municipal police, and civil protection. He was also a member of the Municipal Assembly of Cascais and chairman of the Youth Institute.

He is a younger brother of Armando Marques Guedes, political scientist, anthropologist and former diplomat.

References
 Minister Of The Presidency And Parliamentary Affairs.

1957 births
Living people
Portuguese politicians
20th-century Portuguese lawyers
People from Cascais